"Second to No One" is a song written and recorded by American country music artist Rosanne Cash.  It was released in July 1986 as the fourth single from the album Rhythm & Romance.  The song reached #5 on the Billboard Hot Country Singles & Tracks chart.

Chart performance

References

1986 singles
1986 songs
Rosanne Cash songs
Songs written by Rosanne Cash
Song recordings produced by David Malloy
Columbia Records singles